Temppeliaukio Church is a Lutheran church in the Töölö neighborhood of Helsinki.  The church was designed by architects and brothers Timo and Tuomo Suomalainen and opened in 1969. Built directly into solid rock, it is also known as the Church of the Rock and Rock Church.

History and architecture

Plans for the Temppeliaukio/Tempelplatsen (Temple square) began as early as the 1930s when a plot of land was selected for the building and a competition for the design was held. The plan by J. S. Siren, the winner of the second competition to design the architecture of the church, was interrupted in its early stages when World War II began in 1939. After the war, there was another architectural competition, subsequently won by Timo Suomalainen and Tuomo Suomalainen in 1961. For economic reasons, the suggested plan was scaled back and the interior space of the church then reduced to about one-quarter of its original plan. Construction finally began in February 1968, and the rock-temple was completed for consecration in September 1969.

The interior was excavated and built directly out of solid rock and is bathed in natural light which enters through the skylight surrounding the center copper dome. The church is used frequently as a concert venue due to its excellent acoustics. The acoustic quality is created by the rough, virtually unworked rock surfaces. The iconic rock walls were not included in the original competition entry, even though the Suomalainen brothers had considered the idea, because they believed that it was too radical for the competition jury. But when conductor Paavo Berglund shared his knowledge of acoustics from some of the best music halls and the acoustical engineer Mauri Parjo gave requirements for the wall surfaces, the Suomalainen brothers discovered that they could fulfill all the requirements for the acoustics by leaving the rock walls exposed in the Church Hall.

The Temppeliaukio church is one of the most popular tourist attractions in the city; half a million people visit it annually. The stone-hewn church is located in the heart of Helsinki. Maintaining the original character of the square is the fundamental concept behind the building. The idiosyncratic choice of form has made it a favorite with professionals and aficionados of architecture.

The church furnishings were designed by the architects. Organ builder Veikko Virtanen manufactured the church organ, which has 43 stops and 3001 pipes.

There are no bells at the church; a recording of bells composed by Taneli Kuusisto is played via loudspeakers on the exterior wall.

Before the construction of the church was even fully complete it made headlines when on the nights of 16 and 17 July 1968 a group of Christian students painted in large letters "BIAFRA" in several places on the exterior walls of the building to bring attention to the famine then going on in Biafra, which had declared independence from Nigeria in 1967. The argument of the students - then part of the '60s student revolutionary movement - was that the money spent on the new lavish church could be better spent on aid to Biafra and elsewhere in Africa.

Gallery

References

External links

Töölö Congregation: the congregation that uses Temppeliaukio Church
Picture of Church and short history

Cave churches
Churches completed in 1969
Lutheran churches in Helsinki
20th-century churches in Finland
Modernist architecture in Finland
Töölö